In United States presidential elections, citizens who are registered to vote cast ballots for members of the Electoral College, who then cast electoral votes for president and vice president. In order to be elected to office, a candidate must win an absolute majority of electoral votes. Since the Twenty-third Amendment gave citizens residing in the District of Columbia the right to vote, this has meant winning at least 270 of the 538 electoral votes.

Since the Twelfth Amendment in 1804, electors have cast separate votes for the president and vice president. Previously, each elector cast two votes for president, and the winner and runner-up became president and vice president, respectively.

Definition of the margin

Informal definition
The margin of victory in a U.S. presidential election, with the exception below, is the difference between the number of Electoral College votes garnered by the candidate with an absolute majority of electoral votes (since 1964, it has been 270 out of 538) and the number received by the second place candidate (currently in the range of 2 to 538, a margin of one vote is only possible with an odd total number of electors or a faithless elector).

The exception occurs if no candidate receives an absolute majority of votes in the Electoral College. In such a situation, the House of Representatives holds a contingent presidential election. As prescribed by the Constitution, the House chooses from among the three candidates who received the most electoral votes. (Thus, the winner could be a candidate who initially finished in third-place with one electoral vote.) Each state delegation votes en bloc, with each state having a single vote. A candidate is required to receive an absolute majority of state delegation votes (currently 26 votes) in order for that candidate to become the president-elect.

Because the Electoral College has grown in size, the results are normalized to compensate. For example, take two elections, 1848 and 1968. In the election of 1968, Richard Nixon won with a majority of 32 votes. At first glance, the election of 1848 appears closer, because Zachary Taylor won with a majority of only 18 votes, however, Nixon could have received as many as 269 votes above a majority (if he had won unanimously), while Taylor could only have received 145 votes above the majority. Thus, the two elections must be normalized to each other to compare them: Nixon's margin of victory is calculated by dividing 32 by 269 to get 0.119. The same is done with Taylor by dividing 18 by 145, to get 0.124. Nixon's election was actually closer, because a smaller fraction of the electors separated Nixon from facing a contingent election in the House.

While the above explanation applies to modern elections, initially the process was different. Prior to the ratification of the Twelfth Amendment in 1804, the winner of the presidential election was whoever received both a majority of electors to vote for them, and who received the most votes, because each elector cast two presidential votes. Thus, if two candidates had above 50% of the electors, the margin of victory is the victorious candidate's margin over the other candidate who had above 50% of the electors. Of the four elections prior to the 12th Amendment, 1792 and 1800 both involved two candidates receiving above 50% of the electoral votes.

Mathematical definition
The margin of victory in the election is calculated as follows:

Let c be the total number of electors voting in the election. Let w be the number of electoral votes cast for the candidate with the most electoral votes, and let r be the number of votes for the runner-up.

The Constitution provides that if the candidate with the most votes does not receive a simple majority of the electors voting, the House of Representatives chooses the president.  So, the margin of victory is the number of electoral votes over both the runner-up and half the electoral votes cast.  For elections after the passage of the 12th Amendment, the runner-up will always have less than half of the electoral votes cast, so the absolute margin of victory will be the difference of the winner's electoral votes and half the electoral votes cast. To express this in mathematical formulae:

 

The minimum possible value for the margin of victory is clearly zero. The maximum possible value of the margin of victory occurs in the case in which each elector casts a vote for the winning candidate and the runner-up gets no more than half of the vote. In this case, the maximum margin of victory is c/2. In order to meaningfully compare election to election, we need that maximum margin to be constant from election to election. Thus, we divide the absolute margin of victory by c/2 to get a normalized margin of victory that ranges from 0 to 1:

Table of election results

Under the procedure provided in Article II, Section 1, Clause 3 of the Constitution, by which the Electoral College functioned during the first four presidential elections (prior to ratification of the Twelfth Amendment), each elector cast two votes, one for president and one for vice president, but did not distinguish between them. The table's "runner-up" column shows the number of electoral votes for the candidate receiving the second highest number of combined electoral votes, and thus was elected vice president, for each of these elections except for the 1800 election, which ended in a tie between two candidates – the presidential and vice presidential candidates of the same party. The value in the "runner-up" column for 1800 is the number of electoral votes received by the presidential candidate of the other major political party (even though the two winning candidates each received more electoral votes than he did). The number in parentheses in the "Rank" column is the rank that would have been assigned to this election under the rules of the 12th Amendment.

In the following table, the election of 1824 is ranked closer than the election of 1800 because the 1800 election resulted in a tie between the same party's candidates for president and vice president (as presidential and vice presidential electoral votes were not distinguished), while the election of 1824 resulted in the contingent election in the House of Representatives selecting the candidate who had won the second highest number of electoral votes (out of the top three) since no candidate got a majority, 41 presidents have won a large total number of electoral votes, Franklin D. Roosevelt received the most total of electoral votes received by and candidate who was elected to the office of president due to him being the only one to serve more than 2 terms (1,876) and John Adams received the smallest (136).

See also
 List of United States presidential elections by popular vote margin
 United States presidential elections in which the winner lost the popular vote
 National Popular Vote Interstate Compact

Notes

References

External links 
 How close were U.S. Presidential Elections? - Michael Sheppard, Massachusetts Institute of Technology

United States Electoral College
United States presidential elections by Electoral College margin